Nakatake (written: 中武) is a Japanese surname. Notable people with the surname include:

, Japanese cyclist
, Japanese footballer

Japanese-language surnames